Masters M45 hammer throw world record progression is the progression of world record improvements of the hammer throw M45 division of Masters athletics.  Records must be set in properly conducted, official competitions under the standing IAAF rules unless modified by World Masters Athletics.

The M45 division consists of male athletes who have reached the age of 45 but have not yet reached the age of 50, so exactly from their 45th birthday to the day before their 50th birthday. The M45 division throws exactly the same 7.257 kg implement as the Open division.  Most of these competitors all threw their records in open competition. In 1922 through 1925 Matt McGrath threw 49.89, 51.14, 52.53 and 54.09.

Key

References

Masters Athletics Hammer Throw list
All Time Athletics

Masters athletics world record progressions
Hammer